Lugny may refer to the following places in France:

 Lugny, Saône-et-Loire, a commune in the department of Saône-et-Loire
 Lugny, Aisne, a commune in the department of Aisne
 Lugny-Bourbonnais, a commune in the department of Cher
 Lugny-Champagne, a commune in the department of Cher
 Lugny-lès-Charolles, a commune in the department of Saône-et-Loire
 Vault-de-Lugny, a commune in the department of Yonne